Aadu 2 is a 2017 Indian Malayalam-language slapstick comedy film written and directed by Midhun Manuel Thomas and produced by Vijay Babu under Friday Film House,  Art Direct by Arun Venjaramoodu, It is the sequel to the 2015 film Aadu, and Jayasurya, Saiju Kurup, Vijay Babu, Vinayakan, Dharmajan Bolgatty, Sunny Wayne, Harikrishnan, Bhagath Manuel,  Vineeth Mohan and Harikrishnan reprise their roles. Principal photography began on 13 September 2017. The film released in India on 22 December 2017.

Plot
  
The film starts from Mangalore, where a group of smugglers discussing to smuggle black money of 500 Rs. Gang member of smugglers Prabhakaran hires 2 distinct state labours to handover a box of coinage by which they can earn crores of money. As per his instruction, they make him unconscious and escapes to a local station named Gomangalam, state of Tamil Nadu.

In the highrange of Idukki lives Shaji Pappan, who is now living with all of his troubles and Back Pain. He now leads a normal life with his friends in house along with his mother and niece. He earns a living by farming. When Krishnan and Capt. Cleetus are on the way to Pappan's estate with manure, they are blocked by Sub Inspector. Here enters Shaji Pappan, who gets enraged and throws him into a nearby dam without knowing there is some sandalwood along with manure. The offense is charged on him on case for throwing a SI and illegally smuggling sandal. Later he is bailed out on wherewithal of hostage of 2 person and a compensation of Rs. 50,000, on a condition of signing at the local police station. On the other side, Sarbath Shameer, after getting suspended from his department, requests to P.P Sasi Aashan, who is now Home minister to give back his position.

On Sasi's recommendation, Shameer again becomes SI where Shaji resides. Shaji and his team decide to compete in a tug-of-war tournament in which the first prize is a massive gold trophy. They find out that the entry fee costs Rs. 50 Thousand; and the only way to get that amount of money is by putting Shaji's house on mortgage. His mother furiously objects to this idea, forcing Shaji to steal the documents and secretly giving it to Irumbu Abdullah. Shaji's team starts training for the tournament.

The scene then cuts to Dude and his gang. After their failure to complete their mission in the prequel, the gang along with the driver Paili are unable to go back to Bangkok. Dude now works in a restaurant situated in the Kerala-Tamil Nadu borders under the name Sulaiman. The gang starts digging a tunnel to rob a bank near the restaurant.

Meanwhile, Shaji's team enters the tournament and triumphantly wins the gold trophy. The team comes home and Shaji boasts about his victory to his mother and spills the beans about stealing the documents. Shaji decides to flaunt the trophy but then they realize that their trophy is stolen and replaced with a bamboo one. At this point Shaji's mother suffers a seizure and is carried to the hospital. Upon waking up, she curses loudly at Shaji, blaming and scolding him. Later Kuttan Moonga  tells Shaji that he tracked the person who stole the trophy. The thief was Anali Sabu, brother of the deceased criminal Chekuthan Lassar. His team had been second in the tournament. Seeking revenge, Shaji and group break into Sabu's dance party to retrieve the trophy. They also beat up Sabu and his men and destroy the place in the process.

A few days later, Shaji returns home to find his house in flames. They are shocked to see Anali Sabu and his supposedly-dead brother Chekuthan Lasser outside. Lassar demands a hefty sum as compensation for the damages they had done at the party. Shaji is knocked down unconscious and ends up at hospital next to his mother. Dude's gang completes the tunnel after six months of hard work and Paili commits the heist on 8 November 2016. Unfortunately, Prime Minister Narendra Modi orders de-monetisation (2016 Indian banknote demonetisation) of Rs.500  and Rs. 1,000 notes the same night; shocking the entire nation and especially Dude. Shaji regains consciousness the next day and learns about the de-monetisation. As a result, Shaji is left unsure of how to raise money for all these expenses piling up on him. This is also bad news for underworld dealer Satan Xavier; but Kanjav Soman and Battery Simon  who had started working for Xavier because of financial crisis are hit even harder.

At the same time, Mahesh Shetty, who is involved in counterfeiting business, is also disappointed. But the next day, he receives an offer from one of his white-collar friends who says that he can give him the engraving plates of the new 500 rupee notes which have not yet been released. He demands $2 million in $ for the plates and Shetty agrees. But Shetty's trusted partner decides to cheat him by making a deal with Satan Xavier for $3 million. He does this by hiring two Bengalis to take the plates and knock himself out, giving the impression of theft. Soman goes to Dude's restaurant and the latter is furious on seeing him, but learns about the deal. Dude decides to return to his former self and steal the plates. But first he attacks his employer and blows up the restaurant.

Shaji Pappan, having run out of ideas to raise money, decides to fix his back and beat up Lassar's back. Arakkal Abu contacts a Bengali doctor from Rajasthan to buy backache medicine. Coincidentally, the engraving plates and the medicine were to arrive at the same station. Shaji and team reach the station first and receive the plates instead, and Xavier's men get the medicine.

After a series of relentless pursuits to retrieve the plates by Xavier, Dude, Abdullah and Shameer, they end up in the hands of Shaji and his team. They use it to solve their problems and informs the police that they have the plates. The government officials let's them know that they will receive 10,001 rupees as a prize for their honesty which was not even enough to buy his medicine for backpain and Shaji finally meets the crafty driver who took off with his wife in the midst of another and possibly similar escapade.

Cast 

 Jayasurya as Pannimattathil Shaji Pappan aka Shajiettan
 Vijay Babu as S.I. Sarbath Shameer
 Sunny Wayne as Saathaan Xavier
 Vinayakan as Damodaran Unni makan Delmen Edakochi (DUDE)
 Saiju Kurup as Arakkal Abu 
 Dharmajan Bolgatty as Captain Sachin Cleetus
 Vineeth Mohan as Kuttan Moonga
 Unni Rajan P. Dev as Bastin Pathrose
 Harikrishnan as Lalan P. K. aka Lolan
 Bhagath Manuel as Krishnan Mandaram
 Indrans as Home Minister P. P. Sasi Aashan
 Aju Varghese as Driver Ponnappan (Cameo role)
 Sijoy Varghese as Kesav Sharma I.P.S., Joint Director of Intelligence
 Hariprashanth M. G. as Chekuthan Lassar
 Anson Paul as Anali Sabu 
 John Kaippallil as Mahesh Shetty
 Sudhi Koppa as Kanjavu Soman, now Saathaan's ally
 Bijukuttan as Battery Simon, now Saathaan's ally
 Nelson Sooranadu as Dragon Paili
 Baiju as Panchayath President Uthup Theckeparambil, Anagapara Grama Panchayath
 Mamukkoya as Irumbu Abdullah
 Irshad as Prabhakaran
 Ponnambalam as Mayilvahanam, Dude's boss/Hotel owner
 Jayasanker Karimuttam as Lonappan
Sonal Devraj and Nicole Concessao as Dancers in the song "Changaathi Nannaayaal"
 Nazreen Nazar as Stella
 Srindaa as Mary, Shaji Pappan's ex-wife (Cameo role)
 Sethu Lakshmi as Mariyama aka Thalla, Shaji Pappan's Mother
 Athira Patel as Rachael, Shaji Pappan's Niece
 Manikandan Cheruvathur as S.I. Pradeep Kumar
 Noby Marcose as Constable
 Pradeep Kottayam as Constable
 Ameya Mathew as Ponnappan's lover
 Niveditha as the goat
 Sean as the goat 2

Production  
The film is a sequel to the 2015 film Aadu produced by Vijay Babu and Sandra Thomas under the banner of Friday Film House and directed by Midhun Manuel Thomas.

Soundtrack
The film features soundtrack composed by Shaan Rahman, it was released by Friday Film House. Lyrics for the songs were written by B. K. Harinarayanan, Manu Manjith, and Preethi Nambiyar. A single titled "Aadu 2 – Success Song" was also released, composed and sung by the sister duo Amrutha Suresh and Abhirami Suresh.

Box office
The film collected  3.45 crore on the opening day, the highest opening day for a Jayasurya movie, and  13 crore in the first weekend (5 days) in Kerala box office. It grossed $453,294 from 38 screens in the opening weekend (18 – 21 January) in the United Arab Emirates and $548,189 in three weeks. The film earned $31,776 ( 20.43 lakh) from the United States in four weeks. The film was one of the highest grossing Malayalam film of the year 2017 and ran over 100 days in theatres.

Sequel
A sequel titled Aadu 3 was announced on the 100th-day success party of Aadu 2.

References

External links

2017 films
2010s Malayalam-language films
Indian slapstick comedy films
Films scored by Shaan Rahman
Indian sequel films
Malayalam films in series
Films directed by Midhun Manuel Thomas
Indian action comedy-drama films
2017 comedy-drama films